Gold is the fifth compilation by the Modus band, released on OPUS Records in 2005.

Track listing

Official releases
 2005: Gold, CD, OPUS, #91 2708

Credits and personnel

 Ján Lehotský - lead vocal, writer, keyboards
 Marika Gombitová - lead vocal, back vocal
 Miroslav Žbirka - lead vocal, chorus, guitar
 Kamil Peteraj - lyrics
 Boris Filan - lyrics
 Miroslav Jevčák - lead vocal
 Karol Morvay - lead vocal
 
 Jozef Paulíny - lead vocal
 Ivona Novotná - lead vocal
 Ľuboš Stankovský - lead vocal
 Pavol Hammel - lead vocal
 Ján Červenka - mastering
 Tibor Borský - photo

See also
 The 100 Greatest Slovak Albums of All Time

References

General

Specific

External links 
 

2005 compilation albums
Modus (band) compilation albums